Real Sports with Bryant Gumbel is a monthly sports news magazine on HBO. Since its debut on April 2, 1995, the program has been presented by television journalist and sportscaster Bryant Gumbel.

Overview

Format
Each episode consists of four stories covering society and sports, famous athletes, or problems afflicting sports.

As of 2018, the show has been honored with 32 Sports Emmy Awards and won Peabody Awards in 2012 and 2015.

Real Sports was the inspiration for two other HBO shows: On the Record with Bob Costas and Costas Now.

Correspondents
Current Correspondents:
 Bryant Gumbel (host)
 Mary Carillo
 Jon Frankel
 Andrea Kremer
 Soledad O'Brien
 David Scott
 Carl Quintanilla
 Kavitha Davidson
 Ariel Helwani

Former correspondents:
 James Brown
 Bryan Burwell 
 Frank Deford 
 Jim Lampley
 Sonja Steptoe 
 Lesley Visser
 Armen Keteyian
 Bernard Goldberg

Notable stories

Camel Jockeys – Sports of Sheikhs

In 2004, guided by human rights activist Ansar Burney, an HBO team used a hidden camera to document slavery and torture in secret desert camps where boys under the age of five were trained to race camels, a national sport in the United Arab Emirates. This half-hour investigative report exposed a carefully hidden child slavery ring that bought or kidnapped hundreds of young boys in Pakistan and Bangladesh. These boys were then forced to become camel jockeys in the UAE. The report also questioned the sincerity of U.S. diplomacy in pressuring an ally, the UAE, to comply with its own stated policy of banning the use of children under 15 from camel racing.

The documentary won a Sports Emmy Award in 2004 for "Outstanding Sports Journalism" and the 2006 Alfred I. duPont–Columbia University Award for outstanding broadcast journalism. It also brought world attention to the plight of child camel jockeys in the Middle East and helped Ansar Burney Trust to convince the governments of Qatar and the UAE to end the use of children in this sport.

Jack Johnson and Kelly Slater singing "Home (Live from the Beach)"

During the summer of 2013, Jon Frankel's interview with Kelly Slater spawned an HBO Sports video of Jack Johnson and Kelly Slater performing "Home (Live from the Beach)".

Controversial remarks
In February 2006, Gumbel made remarks regarding the Winter Olympics and the lack of African-American participation.

On the August 15, 2006 episode of Real Sports with Bryant Gumbel, Gumbel made the following remarks about former NFL commissioner Paul Tagliabue and National Football League Players Association president Gene Upshaw and directed these comments to new commissioner Roger Goodell: 

In response, Tagliabue said, "What Gumbel said about Gene Upshaw and our owners is about as irresponsible as anything I've heard in a long time." Gumbel replied with, "It's a lot like covering any story [...] You see what is in front of you and you report on it."

On the October 18, 2011 episode, Gumbel invoked slavery in his criticism of NBA Commissioner David Stern over the league's lockout.

See also
 Outside The Lines
 E:60
 On the Record with Bob Costas
 Costas Now
 60 Minutes Sports

References

External links
Official site

Columbus Dispatch Article
Real Sports - Fang's Bites

HBO original programming
HBO Sports
American sports television series
2010 in bodybuilding
History of female bodybuilding
1990s American television news shows
2000s American television news shows
2010s American television news shows
1995 American television series debuts
English-language television shows
HBO Shows (series) WITHOUT Episode info, list, or Article